Berta Betanzos Moro (born 15 January 1988 in Santander) is a Spanish sports sailor.

She won the gold medal in the 2011 ISAF Sailing World Championships (with Tara Pacheco) and the silver medal in the 470 World Championships of 2009 (also with Pacheco).  In 2009, the team also won the European Junior Title.  In 2011, she and Pacheco won the European 470 title.  She won the 49er FX gold at the 2016 ISAF Sailing World Championships with Támara Echegoyen.

At the 2012 Summer Olympics, she competed in the Women's 470 class (also with Pacheco) finishing 10th.

For the 2016 Summer Olympics, she competed in the 49er FX class with Támara Echegoyen.

References

External links
 
 
 

Spanish female sailors (sport)
Living people
Olympic sailors of Spain
Sailors at the 2012 Summer Olympics – 470
49er FX class sailors
470 class world champions
Sailors at the 2016 Summer Olympics – 49er FX
People from Santander, Spain
1988 births
49er FX class world champions
World champions in sailing for Spain